The 2015 Delaware State Hornets baseball team represented Delaware State University in the sport of baseball during the 2015 college baseball season.  The Hornets competed in Division I of the National Collegiate Athletic Association (NCAA) and the Eastern Division of the Mid-Eastern Athletic Conference (MEAC). The team was coached by J. P. Blandin, who entered his fifteenth season at Delaware State. The Hornets looked to build upon their appearance in the 2014 MEAC baseball tournament, where they were eliminated after losing after two straight games in the tournament, the first to Savannah State and then Coppin State.

Departures

Roster

Schedule

References

Delaware State
Delaware State Hornets baseball seasons
Horn